William James Morris  (22 August 1925 – 31 October 2013) was a Church of Scotland minister and an author.

He was born in Cardiff  on 22 August 1925 and educated at Cardiff High School and the University of Edinburgh, where he gained a PhD in 1954. He was Assistant Minister at  Canongate Kirk and then Minister at the Presbyterian Church of Wales at Cadoxton and Barry Island. He then held further ministries at Buckhaven, St David's, Peterhead and Glasgow Cathedral.

While Minister of the Old Parish Church (or Muckle Kirk) in Peterhead, he was chaplain to Peterhead Prison.

He married Jean Howie, daughter of Rev. D. P. Howie Minister of The Laigh Kirk, Kilmarnock 1916–1966, on 3 September 1952. They had 1 son, David, born in 1960.

He was  Dean of the Chapel Royal in Scotland from 1991 to 1996. An Honorary Chaplain to the Queen from 1969, he was also Chaplain to the Queen's Body Guard for Scotland (The Royal Company of Archers) from 1994 to 2007.

He died on 31 October 2013.

Notes

1925 births
2013 deaths
Clergy from Cardiff
People educated at Cardiff High School
Alumni of the University of Edinburgh
20th-century Ministers of the Church of Scotland
Deans of the Chapel Royal in Scotland
Knights Commander of the Royal Victorian Order
Honorary Chaplains to the Queen
21st-century Ministers of the Church of Scotland